Shandong Wuzheng Group Co., LTD (Wuzheng or Wuzheng Group)is a car truck and agricultural machinery manufacturing company registered in China. Their headquarters are located in Shandong, Rizhao.

Wuzheng Group was the county tractor station, in 2000 it became a private company in 2000. In 2012, Wuzheng Group had a revenue of US$2.3 Billion.

History
1962, Wulian tractor station was found.
1984, Changed name to Wulian general machine shop.
1995, First exported to overseas.
2005, Changed name to "Wuzheng Group".

References

External links
 
 
 
 
 

Chinese brands
Truck manufacturers of China
Car manufacturers of China